Gabriel R. González (born 15 February 1988 in Nayarit) is a Mexican footballer who played as a midfielder.

Career
After spending time in the USL PDL with Ventura County Fusion Gonzalez signed for the Los Angeles Blues of the USL Pro. On 2 April 2013 Gonzalez made his debut for the Blues against new expansion franchise VSI Tampa Bay FC in which he came on in the 78th minute as the Blues lost the match 1–0.

Career statistics

Club
Statistics accurate as of 7 April 2013

References

External links 
 Blues Profile.

1988 births
Living people
Mexican expatriate footballers
Mexican footballers
Oxnard College alumni
Ventura County Fusion players
Fresno Fuego players
Orange County SC players
Association football midfielders
Footballers from Nayarit
Expatriate soccer players in the United States
USL League Two players
USL Championship players